Blue Cat Records was the name of two unconnected record labels.

Blue Cat Records (US) was a subsidiary label of Red Bird Records. It had a hit in 1965 with "The Boy from New York City" by the Ad Libs.

Blue Cat Records (UK) was a subsidiary label of Trojan Records. Around 170 records were released on the label between 1968 and 1969, with a variety of early reggae and rocksteady releases from artists such as The Pioneers, The Uniques, The Concords, The Untouchables and The Maytones. The label is considered very collectable, with many discs fetching three-figure sums. most recently The Concords Bettoo sold for almost four figures.

See also
 List of record labels

Defunct record labels of the United States
Pop record labels
British record labels
Record labels established in 1964
Record labels disestablished in 1966
Record labels established in 1968
Record labels disestablished in 1969
Reggae record labels
1968 establishments in the United Kingdom